Bishop Marrocco/Thomas Merton Catholic Secondary School, officially Bishop Marrocco/Thomas Merton Catholic Secondary School and Regional Arts Centre (referred to known as The Regional Arts School @ Marrocco, BMTMCSS, Bishop Marrocco/Thomas Merton, or simply Marrocco/Merton) is a Catholic secondary school located in Toronto, Ontario, Canada part of the Toronto Catholic District School Board, formerly the Metropolitan Separate School Board and serves about 740 students in grades 9 to 12.

The school is a merger of two existing high schools. It was founded in 1880 as St. Joseph's Commercial School by the Sisters of St. Joseph and was renamed to Thomas Merton Catholic Secondary School in honour of the American monk Thomas Merton and in 1986, the present school, Bishop Francis Marrocco Catholic Secondary School was established, though the latter was named after Auxiliary Bishop Francis Marrocco and in 1988, the two schools merged. The present high school is housed in the former West Park Secondary School, opened in 1968 by the Toronto Board of Education, currently owned by the Toronto District School Board in which the campus is leased since 1988. The motto for Bishop Marrocco/Thomas Merton is "Growth Through Faith"

History 
One of the oldest catholic secondary schools in Toronto, Bishop Marrocco/Thomas Merton began as two schools. In 1880, the Sisters of St. Joseph established St. Joseph's High School, whose roots dated back to 1854 with the founding of St. Joseph's Academy for Young Ladies. The school was renamed to St. Joseph Commercial School as an all-girls commercial school
in the Cabbagetown area in 1957.

From the beginning, this school was a satellite campus of St. Joseph College Wellesley for its purpose to teach younger women secretarial  skills. Grades 9 and 10 were taught in the Linden building while Grades 11 and 12 were assigned to the Sacre Coeur school on Sherbourne although the students in these grades operated under the SJCS-Wellesley banner. After 1975, the school began to admit male students and the St. Joseph Commercial became a co-educational School. As a result, the school began to search for a new name and in 1985, St. Joseph Commercial was formally renamed again to Thomas Merton Catholic Secondary School.

The present day school, known as Bishop Francis Marrocco was officially established by the Metropolitan Separate School Board on September 2, 1986 using the facilities of Richard W. Scott Catholic Elementary School in the St. Clair/Dufferin area. The namesake, Francis Marrocco was a Toronto Auxiliary Bishop of Italian descent who worked with Archbishop Pocock in the Archdiocese of Toronto's great efforts in the 1960s to extend the availability of Roman Catholic secondary education and was known for helping immigrants adjust to their new life in Canada.

The Marrocco and Merton schools were consolidated in September 1988 in the former West Park Secondary School in the Bloor/Dundas area, which was closed due to low enrollment and the property was ceded over to the MSSB as the new site of the school. The original school consisted of Michael Monk as the first principal, 250 Marrocco students, 500 Merton students and 350 new grade 9 Marrocco/Merton students totaling to 1100 students.

The arts program began in 2004 and the Arts and Culture High Skills program was launched in 2010.

Possible closure or relocation
In 2017, Choice Properties REIT proposed to redevelop the property adjacent to the West Park site, although a replacement school is not ruled out. The TDSB, the owner of the West Park property, proposed that the former school site is to be redeveloped into a residential property.

Overview  
The school has a diverse community of Portuguese, Central American, Ukrainian, Polish, Lithuanian and Filipino descent. It offers a diverse curriculum for students who want to pursue post-secondary education, apprenticeships and trades and gain skills for the world of work. A wide range of athletics (Marrocco/Merton Royals) and extra-curricular activities such as school band, dramatic productions, recording studio, video production, automotive competitions.  It also offers special ESL (English as a Second Language) classes.

As an inner city high school, Marrocco-Merton's facility was built in 1968 as West Park Vocational School, designed by Abram and Ingleson Architects as a four-storey high school features a double gymnasium, a tailoring shop, a chapel, an olympic-size swimming pool, a 700-seat amphitheatre-style auditorium, and a football/soccer field on top of a parking garage.

Highlights 
Regional Arts Centre (RAC) • Congregated Advanced Placement (CAP) • Specialist High Skills Major (SHSM)- Arts & Culture, Business, Construction, Transportation • S.T.A.R.S. Program (Student Training to Acquire Real Life Skills Program) for students in the ME/DD Program • Cooperative Education Learning, including the Ontario Youth Apprenticeship Program (OYAP) • Wireless Digital Labs, Digital Sound Recording Studio, Photography Darkroom, Digital Video Production Lab, 500-person Theatre, Science Labs, a Greenhouse, two technical Design Labs and Transportation Labs, Fitness Facility, and Swimming Pool. • Comprehensive leadership, co-curricular and athletic programs. • Integrated Resource Support Program • Grade 9 Summer School Transition Program for incoming Grade 9 students who can earn a high school credit towards their OSSD.

Feeder Schools 
 St. Helen's Catholic Elementary School
 Holy Family Catholic Elementary School
 St. Vincent de Paul Catholic Elementary School
 St. Rita Catholic Elementary School
 James Culnan Catholic School
 St. Mary of the Angels
 St. Clare Catholic Elementary School

See also 
List of high schools in Ontario
West Park Secondary School

References 

Bishop Marrocco/Thomas Merton Catholic Secondary School. Toronto Catholic District School Board. Retrieved on 2008-03-16.

External links

Bishop Marrocco/Thomas Merton Catholic Secondary School and Regional Arts Centre
TCDSB Portal

Toronto Catholic District School Board
Educational institutions established in 1880
Educational institutions established in 1986
High schools in Toronto
Catholic secondary schools in Ontario
1880 establishments in Ontario
1986 establishments in Ontario
1988 establishments in Ontario
Art schools in Canada
Bill 30 schools